Argyris Kampetsis (born 6 May 1999), also known as Anargyros Kampetsis, is a Greek professional footballer who plays as a striker for Super League club Panathinaikos.

Club career
Kampetsis started playing as a 5 year old for Aris Petroupolis and within 2 years, he was unearthed by AEK Athens legend Toni Savevski at a tournament in the Athens suburb of Pallini. After playing for AEK Athens Academies he moved to Olympiacos Academies where Kampetsis’ career really took off and went to the next level.  His dominance, goal scoring record and all-round game at youth level could not be ignored, and as a result, he became a regular fixture in the youth teams of the Greece national football team setup. He attracted interest from top clubs from England, Germany and Italy but it was German giants Borussia Dortmund who made him the best offer. One that Olympiakos could not match as his playing time would not be guaranteed by then manager Paulo Bento.

He plays mainly as a forward, and joined Panathinaikos from the ranks of Borussia Dortmund II. Kampetsis made his first professional appearance for the team in the 2018–19 Super League game against Lamia on September 1, 2018.
On 23 September 2018, he scored his first goal with the club in a 3–0 home win game against Levadiakos.

On 29 May 2021, Kampetsis is expected to continue his career in Süper Lig club Göztepe, for the amount of €500,000. Kampetsis has reached an agreement with the Turkish club, with whom he is expected to sign a three-year contract. Few months ago had renewed his contract with  Panathinaikos until the summer of 2024. However, the deal fell through.

On 31 August 2021, he joined Willem II on a season-long loan, with a purchase option of €700,000.

Career statistics

References

External links

 

1999 births
Living people
Greece under-21 international footballers
Greece youth international footballers
Greek expatriate footballers
Borussia Dortmund II players
Panathinaikos F.C. players
Willem II (football club) players
Super League Greece players
Eredivisie players
Expatriate footballers in Germany
Expatriate footballers in the Netherlands
Association football midfielders
Footballers from Athens
Greek footballers
Greek expatriate sportspeople in Germany
Greek expatriate sportspeople in the Netherlands